The Paris Institute of Comparative Law (French: Institut de droit comparé de Paris, commonly referred to as "IDC") is a public institution of research and higher education which was founded in 1931 by Henri Capitant and Henri Lévy-Ullmann. It is now affiliated to Panthéon-Assas University.

Library
The Institute administers a library which was created in 1951 and which gathers the Institute's collections and those of the French Society of Comparative Legislation (founded in 1869) and of the French Centre of Comparative Law (founded in 1951). The library holds over fifty thousand volumes.

Notable people
Boris Mirkin-Getzevich

References

Sources

External links
Official website

Paris 2 Panthéon-Assas University
Law schools in France
Schools in Paris
Educational institutions established in 1931
1931 establishments in France